VIPRE Security Group, (also known as VIPRE or VIPRE Security) a brand of Ziff Davis, is a privately held cybersecurity company headquartered in New York. 

VIPRE develops cybersecurity products focused on endpoint and email security along with advanced threat intelligence applications. VIPRE is based globally with operations in Clearwater, Florida, Washington D.C., Vancouver B.C., Keele, United Kingdom, Dublin, Ireland, Copenhagen, Denmark, Stockholm, Sweden, Amsterdam, Netherlands and in  Oslo, Norway.

Corporate history
The company was originally founded in 1994 as Sunbelt Software, which was acquired in 2010 by GFI Software.

In 2013 Sunbelt Software was spun off and renamed to ThreatTrack Security. 

In 2017 they were concentrating on their VIPRE suite and the company now uses that name. The VIPRE portfolio now encompasses endpoint security, with heritage from original Sunbelt Software anti-virus products, email security, with heritage from the UK company Fusemail, Comendo, StaySecure, WeCloud, iCritical and ElectricMail products that had previously been acquired by j2, and security awareness training via the acquisition of Inspired e-Learning.

Later in 2017, VIPRE earned recognition from AV-Comparatives (one of six "top-rated products"), AV-Test and Virus Bulletin.

VIPRE was featured in a PC World Magazine article.

In February 2018 it was acquired by j2 Global.

VIPRE Acquires Inspired eLearning, November 11th 2021
https://www.dcadvisory.com/news-deals-insights/deal-announcements/dc-advisory-advised-inspired-elearning-on-its-sale-to-j2-global/#gref

Acquisitions

Products and services

References

External links 
 https://www.vipre.com/

Computer network security